Bobby or Bob Diamond may refer to:

Bob Diamond (actor) (1943–2019), American actor and lawyer a/k/a Bobby Diamond and Robert Diamond
Bob Diamond (banker) (born 1951), Anglo-American business executive

Characters
Bob Diamond (comics), Marvel Comics character since 1974
Bob Diamond, played by Rip Torn in 1991 American film Defending Your Life

See also
Bobby Dimond (1930–2020), Australian rugby league footballer